Arc is an album by Neil Young and Crazy Horse, recorded early 1991 and released in October 1991. 

The album consists of feedback, guitar noise, improvisations and vocal fragments which were recorded during various live shows on the 1991 US tour, and then re-edited into a 35-minute composition. Arc was originally released with the live album Weld in a special-edition 3-CD set called Arc-Weld. Separate releases of Arc and of Weld soon followed.

Background
According to an interview with Steve Martin of Agnostic Front that appeared in the December 1991 issue of Pulse! magazine, Arc had its genesis in a film that Young made called Muddy Track (referred to in an interview with David Fricke in the November 28, 1991, issue of Rolling Stone), which consisted of the beginnings and endings of various songs from his 1987 European tour. Young placed a video camera on his amplifier during the 1987 tour and recorded the beginnings and endings of various songs, and later edited them down into the film's soundtrack.  "It was the sound of the entire band being sucked into this little limiter, being compressed and fuckin' distorted to hell," Young said to Martin, referring to the soundtrack of Muddy Track. Young then showed the video to Sonic Youth's Thurston Moore, who suggested that he record an entire album in a similar manner. However, Arc was not recorded through video camera microphones, as was the case with Muddy Track, but instead was compiled from various professional multi-track recordings made throughout the tour.

Young's use of experimental guitar feedback was also inspired by Sonic Youth, the noise rock band who opened for parts of his live tours in 1990 and 1991.

Track listing
"Arc (A Compilation Composition)" – 35:00

Personnel
Neil Young – guitar, vocals, computer, feedback
Frank "Poncho" Sampedro – guitar, univox stringman, vocals
Billy Talbot – bass, vocals
Ralph Molina – drums, vocals
with:
Sal Trentino – electronics

See also
Metal Machine Music, a studio album by Lou Reed with a similar concept.

References

Noise rock albums by Canadian artists
Noise rock albums by American artists
Neil Young live albums
1991 live albums
Reprise Records live albums
Live electronic albums
Albums produced by Neil Young
Crazy Horse (band) albums
Sound collage albums